Oedocladium is a genus of green algae in the order Oedogoniales.

References

External links

Chlorophyceae genera
Oedogoniales